The La Jolla Group is a group of geologic formations in coastal southwestern San Diego County, Southern California. Its locations include the coastal La Jolla San Diego region.

The group preserves fossils dating back to the Cretaceous period.

Most of the La Jolla Group stratigraphy was deposited during the Eocene when sea level was higher than its present-day elevation. Eocene aged formations of the La Jolla Group include the Ardath Shale, Delmar Formation or Delmar Sand, Friars Formation, Mount Soledad Formation, Scripps Formation, and Torrey Sandstone (alphabetical order). There are only abundant fossils found in some sections of the Del Mar Formation, mostly bivalve shells.

The La Jolla underlies the Stadium Conglomerate of the Poway Group.

See also

 
 List of fossiliferous stratigraphic units in California
 Paleontology in California

References

Further reading
 
 

Paleogene California
Geology of San Diego County, California
La Jolla, San Diego
Geologic formations of California